Parens occi is a moth of the family Erebidae first described by Michael Fibiger and Vladimir S. Kononenko in 2008. It is known from the southern part of the Russian Far East to central, eastern and northeastern China, North Korea, South Korea, and Jeju Island. In Japan, it is known from the Tsushima Islands in the Korean Strait and Honshu.

Adults are on wing from mid-July to mid-August.

The wingspan is 9–12 mm. The resting position is flat, with the forewing hind margins against each other. The hindwing venation is bifid. The head, patagia, prothorax and costal part of the basal area are blackish, while the rest of the thorax and ground colour of the forewing is unicolorous yellowish, except for the dark grey terminal area and the fringes. The costa has black streaks. All crosslines of the forewing are present, but indistinct and white. The hindwing is unicolorous grey, with a blackish discal spot. The forewing underside is unicolorous brown, while the hindwing underside is beige brown, with a discal spot.

References

Micronoctuini
Moths described in 2008